Stanisław Osiecki (20 May 1875 in Ciechanów - 12 May 1967 in Warsaw) was a Polish politician. Activist of the peasant movements, member of the Polish People's Party, he was a deputy to Polish Sejm both before and after World War II, and a minister in several cabinets of the Second Polish Republic (minister of agriculture in 1923; minister of trade and industry in 1925-1926).

1875 births
1967 deaths
People from Ciechanów
People from Płock Governorate
Polish People's Party "Wyzwolenie" politicians
Polish People's Party "Piast" politicians
People's Party (Poland) politicians
Polish People's Party (1945–1949) politicians
Government ministers of Poland
Deputy Marshals of the Sejm of the Second Polish Republic
Members of the Legislative Sejm of the Second Polish Republic
Members of the Sejm of the Second Polish Republic (1922–1927)
Senators of the Second Polish Republic (1930–1935)
Members of the State National Council
Members of the Polish Sejm 1947–1952
People of the Polish May Coup (pro-government side)
Burials at Powązki Cemetery